The Sunseeker Solar Car Project, Sunseeker for short, is Western Michigan University's solar car team. Each vehicle is designed, built, maintained, and raced by students. Sunseeker has competed in all of the American Solar Challenge events, going back to 1990.

The mission of the Sunseeker Solar Car Project is to design, build, and race solar powered vehicles to advance and demonstrate the abilities of the renewable energy technologies. When not racing, the team participates in numerous events, where they show their cars to the public.

History

1990 
In 1990, WMU's Sunseeker competed in the General Motors sponsored Sunrayce USA that ran from Orlando, Florida to Warren, Michigan. With over 1600 miles and 38 competitors, Sunseeker 77 finished in 8th place.

1991 
In 1991, Sunseeker competed in two Arizona solar challenges. One of them was the Solar and Electric 500 at Phoenix International Speedway where Sunseeker received the honor of 5th place. Sunseeker placed an impressive 2nd place in the Arizona Governor's Cup Solar Challenge, a 2.5 mile Grand Prix course through the streets of Phoenix, Arizona.

1993 

In 1993, GM was joined by the DOE, National Renewable Energy Laboratories and EDS to sponsor the solar challenge. The Sunrayce ran from Dallas, Texas to Minneapolis, Minnesota. Rain and clouds contributed to a disappointing 18th place for Sunseeker 93.

1995 
The NREL, EDS, and GM together sponsored the 1995 Sunrayce. The route ran from the Indianapolis Speedway to Denver, Colorado. Sunseeker 95 took advantage of the excellent chassis from the previous race and built a new array, installed a new power train, refined the aerodynamics, and formed a new strategy. These changes allowed Sunseeker to place 8th in a competitive field of 36 cars.

1997 
The 1997 Sunrayce ran from Indianapolis to Colorado Springs, Colorado with the DOE, EDS and General Motors as its sponsors. The team built an entirely new vehicle for 1997. Sunseeker 97 finished in 16th-place.

1999 
1999 brought about a whole new aerodynamic body design that was different from all previous Sunseeker designs. There was only one problem: rain. Nine of the ten race days from Washington, D.C. to Orlando, Florida were plagued with overcast and rain. The rain damaged one of Sunseeker's two motors, which had to be taken apart and dried. On the last and only sunny day of the race, Sunseeker 454 passed more than 20 competitors and finished 3rd for the day, but still finished in 26th position overall.

2001 

The first American Solar Challenge race in 2001 was sponsored by EDS, the DOE, and NREL. WMU hosted scrutineering where the solar cars are inspected for mechanical, electrical and safety requirements. Sunseeker 95 was modified with a new array panel and more efficient solar cells. The wheels were replaced with the carbon fiber wheels used on the 1999 car. A number of other modifications were made and the car was renamed Sunseeker 295. After a 2400-mile race from Chicago to Los Angeles down Route 66, it finished 5th in Stock Class and 23rd overall.

2003 
For WMU's Centennial in 2003, the team reduced the 1999 car's length and width and constructed an all composite body and chassis of carbon fiber and honeycomb, designed a new rear suspension, built a high efficiency solar array, and installed the hub motors from the '99 car. Entered in the Open Class, again following Route 66, Sunseeker 03 captured 5th place in the race, sporting car number 786. It also won the Inspector's Award for best mechanical and electrical design, the Sportsmanship Award, the Most Improved Award, and EDS's Gold Award for Best Solar Car Design.

2005 
For 2005, the race became the North American Solar Challenge as the route started in Austin, Texas and ran north to Winnipeg, Manitoba then west to Calgary, Alberta. It was the longest solar car race ever at 2500 miles (4000 km). Sunseeker 03 was given a new canopy, stronger rear suspension, improved aerodynamics and renamed Sunseeker 05. With no mechanical or electrical breakdowns, car number 786 crossed the finish line in 6th place and took home the Aesthetics Award for the prettiest car.

Sunseeker 05 can still be seen in public events, such as the Kalamazoo Holiday Parade, along with other past Sunseeker solar cars.

2008 
A radical change in driver seating for the 2008 solar challenge caused all teams to build totally new cars. Sunseeker 08 used the very efficient array from the previous car and was changed to a front wheel drive quasi three wheel vehicle since the two rear wheels were about a foot apart behind the cockpit bulge. However, the array blew off the car during qualifying and the car could not participate in the event. WMU team members joined other teams to assist during the race. At the award ceremony after the race, they received the Sportsmanship Award to a long round of applause.

2010 - 2014 
For 2010, the team introduced a new solar car to compete in the American Solar Challenge. The vehicle was the first, and remains as the only three-wheeled design produced by the team. It has two powered wheels in the front, and a single unpowered wheel in the back. It is considered an experimental motorcycle by the Michigan Secretary of State.

Each of the two CISIRO motors produce 6 horsepower, and enable the 600 pound (without a driver) car to travel at most 80 miles per hour. During races, however, the car's top speed was limited to 45 miles per hour in order to keep it running efficiently.

The 2010 car raced in three American Solar Challenge road races, and five Formula Sun Grand Prix races.

2015 - 2019 
During the Fall 2014 semester, the team began working on the next generation Sunseeker solar car.(Code named Farasi) The car incorporates four wheels, with the two rear wheels being powered. The aeroshell is made of light-weight carbon fiber, while the chassis is made of carbon fiber and chromoly steel. This car was meant to be raced in the 2016 American Solar Challenge but didn't get to compete until the 2017 Formula Sun Grand Prix at Circuit of the Americas in Austin, TX. In 2018 Farasi completed 163 laps at Motorsports Park Hastings for the Formula Sun Grand Prix and ran 52 miles of the American Solar Challenge under a conditional qualification.

2020 - Present 
The current solar car was started in Fall 2018 when the students began the design process. During Spring 2019, the team began their build cycle, though Covid-19 posed issues for the team in 2020 and into 2021. In the Spring and Summer of 2021, the team completed the new car, dubbed Aethon, and competed in the 2021 Formula Sun Grand Prix though they did not qualify for the 2021 American Solar Challenge.

Aethon is powered by a custom built silicon-based solar array and propelled by a single Marand high-efficiency electric motor. It is the team's first asymmetric style car, also known as a catamaran, where the driver sits in-line with the wheels on one side of the car as opposed to all the team's previous cars which had the driver seated, or reclined in a number of the cars before 2008, along the centerline of the vehicle.

Aethon entered into the Formula Sun Grand Prix for 2022 and placed 8th, in the single-occupant vehicle class, out of the 13 teams who made it through scrutineering. It performed 85 laps at Heartland Motorsport Park in Topeka, Kansas, totaling over 212 miles with a fastest lap time of 4 minutes and 2 seconds.

References

External links
 Official site

Solar car racing
Western Michigan University